Guthrie Branch is a  long 1st order tributary to C and D Canal in New Castle County, Delaware.

Variant names
According to the Geographic Names Information System, it has also been known historically as:  
Guthrie Run

Course
Guthrie Branch rises on the Long Creek divide about 0.2 miles east of Pencader Farms in New Castle County, Delaware.  Guthrie Branch then flows south to meet the C and D Canal about 1.5 miles east of Chesapeake City, Maryland.

Watershed
Guthrie Branch drains  of area, receives about 44.9 in/year of precipitation, has a topographic wetness index of 652.80 and is about 26.2% forested.

See also
List of rivers of Delaware

References 

Rivers of Delaware
Rivers of New Castle County, Delaware